Embuscade may refer to:

 Embuscade, the name of several French Navy ships 
 "Embuscade," a song by Phoenix on the 2000 album United